Jacnia  is a village in the administrative district of Gmina Adamów, within Zamość County, Lublin Voivodeship, in eastern Poland.

The village has a population of 560.

References

Villages in Zamość County